Moneo is a French debit card system.

Moneo may also refer to:

José Rafael Moneo, a Spanish architect
Moneo Atreides, a fictional character in the 1981 novel God Emperor of Dune
The Monéo River, in New Caledonia

See also
Moneoa Moshesh (born 1989), a South African singer and actress